Caroline Nagtegaal is a Dutch politician of the People's Party for Freedom and Democracy (VVD) who has been serving as a Member of the European Parliament since 2017.

From 2017 until 2019, Nagtegaal served on the Committee on Economic and Monetary Affairs. Following the 2019 elections, she moved to the Committee on Transport and Tourism. In this capacity, she co-authored a 2019 resolution on the cybersecurity risks posed by trade with China.

In addition to her committee assignments, Nagtegaal is part of the Parliament's delegations for relations with the Arab Peninsula, Mercosur and to the Euro-Latin American Parliamentary Assembly (EuroLat). She is also a member of the European Parliament Intergroup on Seas, Rivers, Islands and Coastal Areas and the European Parliament Intergroup on LGBT Rights.

References

External links

1980 births
Living people
People's Party for Freedom and Democracy MEPs
MEPs for the Netherlands 2014–2019
MEPs for the Netherlands 2019–2024
21st-century women MEPs for the Netherlands